Edgar Howard Sturtevant (March 7, 1875 – July 1, 1952) was an American linguist.

Biography
Sturtevant was born in Jacksonville, Illinois, the older brother of Alfred Sturtevant and grandson of educator Julian Monson Sturtevant. He studied at Illinois College, where his grandfather was president, and obtained an A.B. from Indiana University, then the University of Chicago receiving there in 1901 a Ph.D. with a dissertation on Latin case forms. He became an assistant professor of classical philology at Columbia University before joining the linguistics faculty at Yale University in 1923. In 1924, he was a member of the organizing committee for the founding, with Leonard Bloomfield and George M. Bolling, of the Linguistic Society of America (LSA).

Besides research on Native American languages and field work on the Modern American English dialects, he is the father of the Indo-Hittite hypothesis, first formulated in 1926, based on his seminal work establishing the Indo-European character of Hittite (and the related Anatolian languages), with Hittite exhibiting more archaic traits than the normally reconstructed forms for Proto-Indo-European.

He authored the first scientifically acceptable Hittite grammar with a chrestomathy and a glossary, formulated the so-called Sturtevant's law (the doubling of consonants representing Proto-Indo-European voiceless stops) and laid the foundations to what later became the Goetze-Wittmann law (the spirantization of palatal stops before u as the focal origin of the centum-satem isogloss). The 1951 revised edition of his grammar (co-authored with E. Adelaide Hahn) is still useful today, although it was superseded in 2008 by Hoffner and Melchert's Grammar of the Hittite Language.

Sturtevant died in Branford, Connecticut. His son, Julian M. Sturtevant, was a chemist and molecular biophysicist at Yale University.

Bibliography
Sturtevant, Edgar H. (1931). Hittite glossary: words of known or conjectured meaning, with Sumerian ideograms and Accadian words common in Hittite texts. Language, Vol. 7, No. 2, pp. 3–82., Language Monograph No. 9.

Sturtevant, Edgar H. A. (1933, 1951). Comparative Grammar of the Hittite Language. Rev. ed. New Haven: Yale University Press, 1951 (with E. Adelaide Hahn). First edition: 1933.
Sturtevant, Edgar H. A., & George Bechtel (1935). A Hittite Chrestomathy. Baltimore: Linguistic Society of America.
Sturtevant, Edgar H. (1940). The pronunciation of Greek and Latin. 2d. ed. Philadelphia: Linguistic Society of America, 1940. Review at Whatmough, J., "The Pronunciation of Greek and Latin by Edgar H. Sturtevant", Classical Philology, Vol. 36, No. 4 (Oct., 1941), pp. 409–411.

Sturtevant, Edgar H. (1942). Linguistic Change: An Introduction to the Historical Study of Language. New York: Stechert.
Sturtevant, Edgar H. A. (1942). The Indo-Hittite laryngeals. Baltimore: Linguistic Society of America.

References
 "Sturtevant, Edgar Howard". The Great Soviet Encyclopedia, 3rd Edition (1970–1979).
 Hoffner, Harry and Melchert, H. Craig, 2008. A Grammar of the Hittite Language, Winona Lake, Indiana: Eisenbrauns.

External links
 

1875 births
1952 deaths
People from Jacksonville, Illinois
Columbia University faculty
Linguists from the United States
Hittitologists
Paleolinguists
Linguists of Anatolian languages
Linguistic Society of America presidents

Illinois College alumni
Indiana University alumni